In the United States there are a number of observed holidays where employees receive paid time off.   The labor force in the United States comprises about 62% (as of 2014) of the general population. In the United States, 97% of the private sector businesses determine what days this sector of the population gets paid time off, according to a study by the Society for Human Resource Management. The following holidays are observed by the majority of US businesses with paid time off: New Year's Day, New Year's Eve, Memorial Day, Independence Day, Labor Day, Thanksgiving, the day after known as Black Friday, Christmas Eve and Christmas.  There are also numerous holidays on the state and local level that are observed to varying degrees.

Holiday listing as paid time off
This list of holidays is based on the official list of federal holidays by year from the US Government. The holidays however are at the discretion of employers whose statistics are measured by the Bureau of Labor Statistics. Another list from the Society for Human Resource Management shows actual percentages of employers offering paid time off for each holiday. The term "major holiday" (bolded) coincides for those holidays that 90% or more of employers offered paid time off.
In 2020, Nike became the first company to mark Juneteenth as a paid holiday.

 List of Federal Holidays by Year from the U.S. Government (see Office of Personnel Management)
 Additional holidays referenced by the Society for Human Resource Management: Good Friday 26%, Easter Monday 6%, Yom Kippur 7%, Day before Thanksgiving 3–8%, Day after Thanksgiving 69–75%, Day before Christmas Eve 33%, Christmas Eve 78–79%, Day after Christmas 40–64%, Day before New Year's Eve 25–71% depending if it falls on a weekend, New Year's Eve 71%, Passover 3%, Hanukkah 1%, Ramadan 1%, Ash Wednesday 1%, Diwali 1%, Eid al-Adha 1%, Vietnamese New Year <1%, Chinese New Year <1%

School holidays

An academic year typically spans from early fall to early summer, with two or three months of summer vacation marking the end of the year. K-12 public schools generally observe local, state, and federal holidays, plus additional days off around Thanksgiving, the period from before Christmas until after New Year's Day, a spring break (usually a week in April) and sometimes a winter break (a week in February or March). Two or three days per year are sometimes devoted to professional development for teachers and students have the day off.

Most colleges and universities divide the school year into two semesters. The fall semester often begins the day after Labor Day in early September and runs until mid-December. The spring semester typically starts in the middle or end of January and runs until May. Winter and summer classes might be offered in January and May–August. Major federal, state, and local holidays are often observed, including the day after and usually before Thanksgiving. Spring break is usually a week in March or early April, and in elementary and secondary school and college party culture traditionally involves a warm-weather trip.

Unscheduled weather-related cancellations and emergency cancellations can also affect school calendars.

When taking summer school or summer camp schedules into account, the Independence Day holiday on July4 is usually a scheduled holiday observance for which the summer program closes.

Government sector holidays: federal, state, and local government

The federal government sector labor force consisted of about 2,729,000 (as of 2014) of the total labor force of 150,539,900, which is about 2% of the total labor force or about 1% of the total population. In addition, state and local governments consist of another 19,134,000 bringing the total government sector employees to about 15% of the total labor force. This sector of the population is entitled to paid time off designated as federal holidays by Congress in Title V of the United States Code. Both federal and state government employees generally observe the same federal holidays.

Federally regulated agencies: banks and financial institutions
US banks generally observe the federal holidays because of their reliance on the U.S. Federal Reserve for certain activities such as wire transfers and ACH transactions. For example, JP Morgan Chase observes all federal holidays except Columbus Day, while U.S. Bank observes all of them.

The New York Stock Exchange also closely follows the federal holidays except for Columbus Day. However, the agency also has extra holidays on the day before Independence Day and Good Friday.

Legal holidays by states and political divisions of the United States 

In general, most state governments observe the same holidays that the federal government observes. However, while that is true for most states, every state includes and omits holidays to fit the culture relevant to its population. "All federal holidays" in state observations below excludes Inauguration Day, which is only observed by Washington, DC, and federal employees in that area.

Alabama

 All federal holidays
 January 15–21 (floating Monday) – this federal holiday is renamed "Robert E. Lee/Martin Luther King Birthday"
 February 15–21 (floating Monday)  – this federal holiday is renamed "George Washington/Thomas Jefferson Birthday"
 April 22–28 (floating Monday) – Confederate Memorial Day
 June 1–7 (floating Monday) – Birthday of Jefferson Davis
 October 8–14 (floating Monday) – Renamed Columbus Day / Fraternal Day / American Indian Heritage Day

Baldwin County, Alabama
 All Alabama state holidays
 February 3 – March 9 (floating Tuesday using Computus)  – Mardi Gras

Mobile County, Alabama
 All Alabama state holidays
 February 3 – March 9 (floating Tuesday using Computus)  – Mardi Gras

Perry County, Alabama

 All Alabama state holidays
 November 8–14 (floating Monday) – Barack Obama Day

Alaska

 All federal holidays except Columbus Day
 March 25–31 (floating Monday) – Seward's Day
 October 18 – Alaska Day

American Samoa

 All federal holidays
 April 17 – Flag Day
 December 26 – Family Day

Arizona

 All federal holidays
 January 15–21 (floating Monday) – this federal holiday is renamed "Dr. Martin Luther King Jr./Civil Rights Day".
 February 15–21 (floating Monday) – this federal holiday is renamed "Lincoln/Washington Presidents' Day".

Arkansas

 All federal holidays except Columbus Day
 February 15–21 (floating Monday) – this federal holiday is renamed "George Washington's Birthday and Daisy Gatson Bates Day".
 December 24 – Christmas Eve

California

 All federal holidays except Columbus Day
 March 31 (fixed) – César Chávez Day
 November 23–29 (floating Friday) – day after Thanksgiving

California education holidays

 All California state holidays (schools closed)
 January 23 – Ed Roberts Day (schools open, but with related instructions)
 January 30 – Fred Korematsu Day of Civil Liberties (schools open, but with related instructions)
 February 6 – Ronald Reagan Day (schools open, but with related instructions)
 February 12 – Lincoln's Birthday (schools closed) (some school districts observe the holiday on the second Monday in February)
 February 15 – Susan B. Anthony Day (schools open, but with related instructions)
 March 5 – death of Crispus Attucks (schools open, but with related instructions)
 March 7 – birthday of Luther Burbank / Arbor Day (schools open, but with related instructions)
 March 30 – Vietnamese Veterans Day (schools open, but with related instructions)
 April 6 – California Poppy Day (schools open, but with related instructions)
 April 21 – John Muir Day (schools open, but with related instructions)
 May 8–14 (floating Wednesday) – Day of the Teacher (schools open, but with related instructions)
 May 22 – Harvey Milk Day (schools open, but with related instructions)
 September 22–28 (floating Monday) – Native American Day (schools closed)
 October 25 – Larry Itliong Day (schools open, but with related instructions)

Lincoln's Birthday (February 12) was removed from California's education holiday calendar in 2009.

Berkeley, California

 All California holidays except Cesar Chavez Day
 February 12 (fixed)  – Lincoln's Birthday
 May 19 (fixed) – Malcolm X Day
 October 8–14 (floating Monday) – Indigenous Peoples' Day

San Francisco, California

 All California holidays except Cesar Chavez Day
 October 8–14 (floating Monday) – Columbus Day (added because the holiday was omitted by the California state government)

West Hollywood, California

 All California holidays except Cesar Chavez Day and the Day after Thanksgiving
 May 22 (fixed) – Harvey Milk Day

Colorado

 All federal holidays

Connecticut

 All federal holidays
 February 12 – Lincoln's Birthday
 March 20 – April 23 (floating Friday using Computus) – Good Friday

Delaware

 All federal holidays except Washington's Birthday and Columbus Day
 March 20 – April 23 (floating Friday using Computus) – Good Friday
 November 2–8 (floating Tuesday)  – Election Day (in even-numbered years)
 November 23–29 (floating Friday) – day After Thanksgiving

District of Columbia

 All federal holidays
 January 20 – Inauguration Day (every 4 years)
 April 16 – Emancipation Day

Florida

Florida's laws separately defines "paid holidays" versus "legal holidays", which does not have any obligation to include as "paid holidays".

 All federal holidays except Washington's Birthday and Columbus Day
 November 23–29 (floating Friday) – day after Thanksgiving

Florida legal holidays

Florida's laws separate the definitions between paid versus legal holidays. The following list shows only the legal holidays that were not defined as "paid holidays":
 All Florida state holidays
 January 18 – Martin Luther King Jr.
 February 3 – March 9 (floating Tuesday using Computus) – Shrove Tuesday / Mardi Gras
 February 12 – Lincoln's Birthday
 February 15 – Susan B. Anthony Day
 February 15–21 (floating Monday) – Washington's Birthday (reincluded because the holiday is not listed under the Florida government holidays)
 March 20 – April 23 (floating Friday using Computus) – Good Friday
 April 2 – Pascua Florida Day
 April 26 – Confederate Memorial Day
 June 3 – birthday of Jefferson Davis
 June 14 – Flag Day
 October 8–14 (floating Monday) – renamed holiday as Columbus and Farmers' Day
 November 2–8 (floating Tuesday) – Election Day

Florida circuit courts

 All Florida state holidays
 February 15–21 (floating Monday) – Presidents' Day (reincluded because the Florida state government omits this holiday)
 March 20 – April 23 (floating Friday using Computus) – Good Friday
 September 5 – October 5 (floating date) – Rosh Hashannah
 September 14 – October 14 (floating date) – Yom Kippur

Miami-Dade, Florida

 All Florida state holidays
 February 15–21 (floating Monday) – Presidents' Day (reincluded because the Florida state government excludes this date)
 October 8–14 (floating Monday) – Columbus Day (reincluded because the Florida state government excludes this date)

Georgia

 All federal holidays except President's Day
 April 24–30 (floating Monday) – Confederate Memorial Day
 November 23–29 (Friday after Thanksgiving) – State Holiday, formerly Robert E. Lee Day (observed in other states around January 19)
 December 24 – Washington's Birthday observed. If December 24 is a Wednesday, then this holiday is observed on Friday December 26.

Guam

 All federal holidays
 March 7 – Guam History and Chamorro Heritage Day
 July 21 – Liberation Day
 November 2 – All Souls' Day
 December 8 – Lady of Camarin Day

Hawaii

 All federal holidays except Columbus Day and Juneteenth 
 March 20 – April 23 (floating Friday using Computus) – Good Friday
 March 26 – Prince Jonah Kuhio Kalanianaole Day
 June 11 – Kamehameha Day
 August 15–21 (floating Friday) – Statehood Day
 November 2–8 (floating Tuesday) – Election Day (in even-numbered years)

Idaho

 All federal holidays
 January 15–21 (floating Monday) – this federal holiday is renamed "Martin Luther King Jr.–Idaho Human Rights Day"

Illinois

 All federal holidays
 February 12 – Lincoln's Birthday
 November 2–8 (floating Tuesday) – Election Day (in even-numbered years)
 November 23–29 (floating Friday) – day after Thanksgiving

Chicago, Illinois

 All Illinois state holidays except the Day after Thanksgiving
 March 1–7 (floating Monday) – Pulaski Day

Indiana

 All federal holidays except Washington's Birthday
 March 20 – April 23 (floating Friday using Computus) – Good Friday
 May 1–7 (floating Monday) – Primary Election Day
 November 2–8 (floating Monday) – General Election Day
 November 23–29 (floating Friday) – Lincoln's Birthday to occur on day after Thanksgiving
 December 24 – Washington's Birthday to occur on Christmas Eve

Iowa

 All federal holidays except Washington's Birthday and Columbus Day
 November 23–29 (floating Friday) – Day after Thanksgiving

Kansas

 All federal holidays except Washington's Birthday and Columbus Day

Kentucky

 All federal holidays except Washington's Birthday and Columbus Day
 March 20 – April 23 (floating Friday using Computus) – Good Friday(half holiday)
 November 23–29 (floating Friday) – Day after Thanksgiving
 December 24 – Christmas Eve
 December 31 – New Year's Eve

Louisiana

 All federal holidays except Columbus Day
 February 3 – March 9 (floating Tuesday using Computus) – Mardi Gras
 March 20 – April 23 (floating Friday using Computus) – Good Friday
 November 2–8 (floating Tuesday) – Election Day (in even-numbered years)

Louisiana courts

 All Louisiana state holidays
 November 1 – All Saints' Day
 November 23–29 (floating Friday) – Day after Thanksgiving
 December 24 – Christmas Eve
 December 31 – New Year's Eve

Baton Rouge, Louisiana
 All Louisiana state holidays
 January 20 – Inauguration Day (every four years)

Maine

 All federal holidays
 April 15–21 (floating Monday) – Patriots' Day
 November 23–29 (floating Friday) – Day after Thanksgiving

Maryland

 All federal holidays
 November 2–8 (floating Tuesday) – Election Day (every 2 years)
 November 23–29 (floating Friday) – Native American Heritage Day

Massachusetts

 All federal holidays
 April 15–21 (floating Monday) – Patriots' Day

Suffolk County, Massachusetts
 All Massachusetts state holidays
 March 17 – Evacuation Day
 June 17 – Bunker Hill Day

Michigan

 All federal holidays except Columbus Day
 November 2–8 (floating Tuesday) – General Election Day (even numbered years only)
 November 23–29 (floating Friday) – Day after Thanksgiving
 December 24 – Christmas Eve (if Christmas Eve falls on Sunday as it does in 2023, December 22 is the observed holiday)
 December 31 – New Year's Eve (if New Year's Eve falls on Sunday as it does in 2023, December 29 is the observed holiday)

Minnesota

 All federal holidays except Columbus Day
 November 23–29 (floating Friday) – Day after Thanksgiving

Mississippi

 All federal holidays except Columbus Day
 January 15–21 (floating Monday) – this federal holiday is renamed "Martin Luther King's and Robert E. Lee's Birthdays"
 April 24–30 (floating Monday) – Confederate Memorial Day
 May 25–31 (floating Monday) – renamed National Memorial Day / Jefferson Davis Birthday
 November 11 – renamed Armistice Day (Veterans Day)

Missouri

 All federal holidays
 February 12 – Lincoln's Birthday
 May 8 – Truman Day

Montana

 All federal holidays
 November 2–8 (floating Tuesday) – General Election Day

Nebraska

 All federal holidays
 April 24–30 (floating Friday) – Arbor Day
 November 23–29 (floating Friday) – Day after Thanksgiving

Nevada

 All federal holidays except Columbus Day.
 October 25–31 (floating Friday) – Nevada Day
 November 23–29 (floating Friday) – Family Day

New Hampshire

 All federal holidays (offices remain open on Columbus Day)
 January 15–21 (floating Monday) – this federal holiday is renamed Martin Luther King Jr. Civil Rights Day
 November 23–29 (floating Friday) – the day after Thanksgiving

New Jersey

 All federal holidays
 March 20 – April 23 (floating Friday using Computus) – Good Friday
 November 2–8 (floating Tuesday) – Election Day
Friday following 4th Thursday in November - Day After Thanksgiving (this used to be a state holiday for all branches of government; it is sometimes still proclaimed as a holiday for the Judicial branch of government, usually not until November.)

New Mexico

 All federal holidays except Washington's Birthday
 November 23–29 (floating Friday) – holiday in lieu of Presidents' Day

New York

 All federal holidays
 February 12 – Lincoln's Birthday
 November 2–8 (floating Tuesday) – Election Day

New York City Public Schools

 All New York State holidays and most national school holidays
 January 21 – February 20 (floating on full moon date) – Lunar New Year
 February –  Mid-Winter Recess (includes Lincoln's Birthday and Washington's Birthday)
 March 20 – April 23 (floating Friday using Computus) – Good Friday
 April – Spring Recess
 July–August – Summer vacation (includes Independence Day)
 September 5 – October 5 (floating date) – Rosh Hashannah
 September 14 – October 14 (floating date) – Yom Kippur
 December – Winter Recess (includes Christmas and New Year's Day)
 Eid al-Fitr (date can vary year-round) – Schools are closed if the holiday falls within the academic year
 Eid al-Adha (date can vary year-round) – Schools are closed if the holiday falls within the academic year
 Diwali

North Carolina

 All federal holidays except Washington's Birthday and Columbus Day, plus the following four state holidays:
 March 20 – April 23 (floating Friday using Computus) – Good Friday
 November 23–29 (floating Friday) – Day After Thanksgiving
 December 22–28 (floating days) – Christmas Eve and Day after Christmas (three days sequentially; adjusted if any falls on a weekend)

North Dakota

 All federal holidays except Columbus Day
 March 20 – April 23 (floating Friday using Computus) - Good Friday

Northern Mariana Islands

 All federal holidays
 March 24 – Commonwealth Covenant Day
 March 20 – April 23 (floating Friday using Computus) – Good Friday
 November 4 – Citizenship Day
 December 8 – Constitution Day

Ohio

 All federal holidays

Sandusky, Ohio
 All Ohio holidays except Columbus Day
 November 2–8 (floating Tuesday) Election Day

Oklahoma

 All federal holidays except Columbus Day
 November 23–29 (floating Friday) – Day after Thanksgiving
 December 26 – Day after Christmas

Oregon

 All federal holidays except Columbus Day

Pennsylvania

 All federal holidays
 March 20 – April 23 (floating Friday using Computus) – Good Friday
 November 2–8 (floating Tuesday) – Election Day
 November 23–29 (floating Friday) – Day after Thanksgiving

Puerto Rico

 All federal holidays
 January 6 – Three Kings Day/Epiphany
 January 8–14 (floating Monday) – Eugenio María de Hostos Birthday
 March 2 - American Citizenship Day
 March 22 – Emancipation Day
 March 20 – April 23 (floating Friday using Computus) – Good Friday
 March 22 – April 25 (floating Sunday using Computus) – Easter
 April 15–21 (floating Monday) – José de Diego Birthday
 May 8–14 (floating Sunday) – Mother's Day
 June 15–21 (floating Sunday) – Father's Day
 July 15–21 (floating Monday) – Luis Muñoz Rivera Birthday
 July 25 – Constitution of Puerto Rico Day
 July 27 – José Celso Barbosa Birthday
 November 19 – Discovery of Puerto Rico Day

Rhode Island

 All federal holidays except Washington's Birthday
 August 8–14 (floating Monday) – Victory Day
 November 2–8 (floating Tuesday) – Election Day

South Carolina

 All federal holidays except Columbus Day
 May 10 – Confederate Memorial Day
 November 23–29 (floating Friday) – Day after Thanksgiving
 December 24 – Christmas Eve
 December 26 – Day after Christmas

South Dakota

 All federal holidays except Columbus Day
 October 8–14 (floating Monday) – Native Americans Day

Tennessee

 All federal holidays except Columbus Day
 March 20 – April 23 (floating Friday using Computus) – Good Friday
 December 24 – Christmas Eve

Texas

Texas has three types of state holidays: those on which all state offices are closed, and "partial staffing" and "optional" holidays on which offices are open but with reduced staffing.

The following days are full holidays where all state offices are closed:
 All federal holidays except Columbus Day.
 November 23–29 (floating Friday) – Friday after Thanksgiving
 December 24 – Christmas Eve
 December 26 – Day after Christmas

Texas partial staffing holidays
Texas law designates that the state businesses be "partially staffed" on the following holidays. These holidays can be replaced with an optional holiday per the state employee's choice, but will give up one of these in lieu of the optional holiday.
 January 19 – Confederate Heroes Day
 March 2 – Texas Independence Day
 April 21 – San Jacinto Day
 June 19 – Emancipation Day in Texas
 August 27 – Lyndon Baines Johnson Day

Texas optional holidays
Texas law allows a state employee to replace a partial staffing holiday with one of the following holidays. On these holidays, the state agency is generally required to stay open with minimum staff.
 March 20 – April 23 (floating Friday using Computus) – Good Friday
 March 31 – Cesar Chavez Day (added in section 662.013, was not one of the original "optional holidays" declared in 1999)
 September 5 – October 5 (floating date) – Rosh Hashanah
 September 14 – October 14 (floating date) – Yom Kippur

U.S. Virgin Islands

 All federal holidays
 January 6 – Three Kings Day
 March 31 – Transfer Day
 March 19 – April 22 (floating Thursday using Computus) – Holy Thursday
 March 20 – April 23 (floating Friday using Computus) – Good Friday
 March 23 – April 26 (floating Monday using Computus) – Easter Monday
 July 3 – Emancipation Day
 October 8–14 (floating Monday) – Columbus Day – Virgin Islands–Puerto Rico Friendship Day
 November 1 – D. Hamilton Jackson Day
 December 26 – Christmas Second Day

Utah

 All federal holidays
 July 24 – Pioneer Day

Vermont

 All federal holidays except Columbus Day
 March 1–7 (floating Tuesday) – Town Meeting Day
 August 16 – Bennington Battle Day

Virginia

 All federal holidays
 February 15–21 (floating Monday) – The federal holiday Washington's Birthday is recognized as "George Washington Day".
 October 8–14 (Floating Monday) – The federal holiday Columbus Day is recognized as "Columbus Day and Yorktown Victory Day", which honors the final victory at the Siege of Yorktown in the Revolutionary War.
 November 2–8 (floating Tuesday) Election Day
 November 23–29 (floating Friday) – Day after Thanksgiving

Wake Island

 All federal holidays except Martin Luther King Jr. Day
 All Friday holidays are celebrated on Saturday and all Monday holidays are celebrated on Tuesday to account for the time zone difference with the states. Weekday holidays such as Thanksgiving are celebrated as they fall.
 March 20 – April 23 (floating Friday using Computus) – Good Friday
 March 22 – April 25 (floating Sunday using Computus) – Easter (listed to account for park closing, which normally opens Sundays)
 April 13–15 – Songkran Festival
 December 31 – New Year's Eve

Washington

 All federal holidays except Columbus Day

West Virginia

 All federal holidays
 June 20 – West Virginia Day
 November 2–8 (floating Tuesday) – Election Day / Susan B. Anthony Day (even numbered years only),
 November 23–29 (floating Friday) – Day after Thanksgiving
 December 24 – Christmas Eve (See note below)
 December 31 – New Year's Eve (See note below)
 Note: Christmas Eve and New Year's Eve are half day holidays and are not shifted if they fall on Saturday or Sunday.

Wisconsin

 All federal holidays except Washington's Birthday and Columbus Day
 December 24 – Christmas Eve
 December 31 – New Year's Eve
 January 1 – New Year's Day

Wisconsin Public School Observance Days

Wisconsin's public schools are obligated to observe the 21 days designated by Wisconsin Statute section 118.02 on the designated day unless the day falls on Saturday or Sunday, in which case would move the observance to either the preceding Friday or following Monday. The statutes require the public schools to include instruction relating to the holidays. In this list of holidays, all schools remain open.
 January 15 – Martin Luther King Jr. Day
 February 12 – Lincoln's Birthday
 February 15 – Susan B. Anthony Day
 February 22 – Washington's Birthday
 March 4 – Casimir Pulaski Day
 March 17 – "The Great Hunger" in Ireland
 April 9 – Prisoners of War Remembrance Day
 April 13 – American's Creed Day
 April 19 – Patriots' Day
 April 22 – Environmental Awareness Day
 April 29 – Arbor Day
 June 14 – Robert La Follette Sr. Day
 September 16 – Mildred Fish Harnack Day
 September 16 – Wisconsin Day
 September 17 – Constitution Day
 September 18 – POW-MIA Recognition Day
 September 23 – Bullying Awareness Day
 September 28 – Francis Willard Day
 October 9 – Leif Erikson Day
 October 12 – Columbus Day
 November 11 – Veterans Day

Wyoming

 All federal holidays
 January 15–21 (floating Monday) – renamed Martin Luther King Jr. / Wyoming Equality Day

Federal holidays at the state level
While most federal holidays are observed at the state level, some of these holidays are observed with different names, are observed on different days, or completely not observed in some states of the United States.  a. For example, Martin Luther King Jr. Day is known officially as Martin Luther King, Jr./Civil Rights Day in Arizona, and New Hampshire, Birthday of Dr. Martin Luther King, Jr. in Florida, and Maryland, Martin Luther King Jr. / Idaho Human Rights Day in Idaho, Robert E. Lee/Martin Luther King Birthday in Alabama, and Martin Luther King's and Robert E. Lee's Birthdays in Mississippi.  b. Washington's Birthday is known officially as President's Day in Alaska, California, Hawaii, Idaho, Maryland, Nebraska, New Hampshire, Tennessee, Washington, West Virginia, and Wyoming, Washington-Lincoln Day in Colorado (CRS 24-11-101), Ohio, Lincoln/Washington/Presidents' Day in Arizona, George Washington's Birthday and Daisy Gatson Bates Day in Arkansas, Presidents' Day in Hawaii, Massachusetts, New Mexico, North Dakota, Oklahoma, South Dakota, Texas, and Vermont, Washington's Birthday/President's Day in Maine, Presidents Day in Michigan, Minnesota, Nevada, New Jersey, and Oregon, Lincoln's and Washington's Birthday in Montana, Washington and Lincoln Day in Utah, and George Washington Day in Virginia.  The day after Thanksgiving is observed in lieu of Columbus Day in Minnesota.  Columbus Day is listed as a state holiday in New Hampshire although state offices remain open.  President's Day, Good Friday (11am–3pm), Juneteenth Day (June 19), Columbus Day, Veteran's Day, Partisan Primary Election Day, and General Election Day are listed as a state holiday in Wisconsin although state offices remain open.

Legal holidays observed nationwide
 January 1 – New Year's Day
 May 25–31 (floating Monday) – Memorial Day
 Known officially as National Memorial Day in Alabama,
 and Memorial Day / Decoration Day in Idaho.
 Observed with Jefferson Davis' Birthday, and known officially as National Memorial Day / Jefferson Davis' Birthday, in Mississippi.
 June 19 - Juneteenth
 July 4 – Independence Day
 September 1–7 (floating Monday) – Labor Day
 November 11 – Veterans Day
 Known officially as Armistice Day in Mississippi.
 November 22–28 (floating Thursday) – Thanksgiving
 December 25 – Christmas

See also
 Public holidays in the United States

Notes

References

 
United States, paid
Employee compensation in the United States